Selfie Mummy Googl Daddy is a 2022 Indian Kannada-language drama directed by Prerana Agarwal. The editing is done by Suresh Armugam. The film stars Srujan Lokesh and Meghana Raj in pivotal roles. The music is composed by Shamanth Nag.It mainly gained positive response.

Cast 
Srujan Lokesh as Surya	
Meghana Raj as Shalini
Achyuth Kumar   
Babyshree  
Master Alaap
Dattanna
Girija Lokesh
Sunder Raj
Sudha Baragur

Release
The film was released on 13 May 2022.

References

External links 
 

Indian drama films
2020s Kannada-language films
2022 films
Films shot in Karnataka
2022 drama films